J L Morison (India) Ltd. is an FMCG company based in Mumbai, India. The company has three lines of products – baby care: Morisons Baby Dreams, hair dyes: Bigen and toothpaste for sensitive teeth: Emoform.

Brands
Morisons Baby Dreams is the company's own flagship brand which has a range of baby products for babies from birth to 2 years. The categories include- feeding, hygiene, apparels, toys, mommy needs, grooming, baby gear.

Bigen is a hair colour brand owned by Hoyu company from Japan. JLM is licensee partner and exclusive manufacturer, distributor and marketer for the brand in India.

Emoform-R is a sensitive toothpaste brand owned by Switzerland-based Dr. Wild and Co. JLM is the licensee partner and exclusive manufacturer, distributor and marketer for the brand in India.

Manufacturing
The company has a factory located in Waluj, Aurangabad which exclusively manufactures all the Bigen products for the India market and many products.

Distribution
The company has four main channels of distribution- traditional trade, modern trade, e-commerce and Canteen Store Dept. These are serviced through our wide depot network spread across the country.

References

"Companies remain relevant with constant change". The Times of India. Retrieved 25 February 2019.

"Beard care market grows to Rs 100 crore". The Times of India. Retrieved 25 February 2019.

'Baby wipes market doubles in 5 years'

Manufacturing companies based in Mumbai
Indian companies established in 1934
Manufacturing companies established in 1934